STEM School Highlands Ranch, formerly known as STEM School and Academy, is a free public charter school with a curriculum focused on Science, Technology, Engineering, and Mathematics (STEM), located in Highlands Ranch, Colorado. The school building is located in an office park next to Central Park, a new retail center. The school serves as a K-12 for just under 1,800 students from across the Denver Metro Area.

History

The school originally opened as STEM School and Academy to students grades 6–9 on August 15th, 2011. It was led by principal David Floodeen and served 480 students.

In 2014, the school finished renovations, turning its gym into a two-story high school containing a weight room, art room with kiln, and chemistry lab. This allows for growth into both a middle and a high school.

In 2015, the school had its first graduating class, consisting of one student.

In 2016, the school begins seeking expansion, resulting in the lease and remodeling of the conjoining building and addition of a 5th grade.

In 2017, grades K-4 were added, officially making the school a K-12. The school was also renamed to STEM School Highlands Ranch.

In 2018, anti-suicide programs were implemented to try to lower chances of suicide and school shootings.

In the Fall of 2019, STEM School Highlands Ranch purchased the building that houses grades k-5.

In the Fall of 2020, STEM purchased the neighboring building to house its P-TECH program and the Business Offices for STEM School Highlands Ranch as well as the Charter Network Main Offices of KOSON Network of Schools.

In the Fall of 2021, the school finalized a master plan which includes four new classrooms, relocating the middle school cafeteria to construct a new gym, and a night/new grand entry with a proposed school logo mural. The proposed finish date would be in early 2023. The plan would also be divided into two phases.

The efforts for replicating the flagship campus of STEM School Highlands Ranch began in earnest in the Fall of 2021 as the school hired a Replication Officer. The STEM Board of Directors began to officially organize KOSON Network of Schools to serve as the Charter Network organization. STEM/KOSON then submitted two applications for replication, one to Denver Public Schools (STEM School Denver K-5) and one to Douglas County Schools (STEM School Sterling Ranch K-12) in March of 2022. Applications are pending approval with both school districts as of May 2022.

In the Winter/Spring of 2022, Penny Eucker was named CEO of KOSON Network of Schools and LynAnn Kovalesky was promoted from Elementary School Director to the Interim Executive Director of STEM School Highlands Ranch. That summer, Penny Eucker resigned from her position as CEO.

Mass shooting 

A shooting incident on May 7, 2019, left one student dead and eight others injured. The shooting was carried out by two students from the school.

Facilities
The campus has three engineering labs, four computer labs, a chemistry lab, a weight room, one small gym, and three parking lots which encase the building on all but the north side of the school facility.

References 

2011 establishments in Colorado
Charter schools in Colorado
Educational institutions established in 2011
Schools in Douglas County, Colorado
Charter K-12 schools in the United States